KWTV-DT (channel 9) is a television station in Oklahoma City, Oklahoma, United States, affiliated with CBS. It is the flagship broadcast property of locally based Griffin Media, and is co-owned with MyNetworkTV affiliate KSBI (channel 52). Both stations share studios on West Main Street in downtown Oklahoma City, while KWTV-DT's transmitter is located on the city's northeast side.

History

Early history
John Toole "J. T." Griffin—the owner and president of the Griffin Grocery Company, a Muskogee-based wholesaler and manufacturer of condiments and baking products, states that he inherited from his father, John Taylor Griffin, after the elder company co-founder died in 1944—became interested in television broadcasting around 1950, after noticing during one of his commutes that many homes in the Oklahoma City area had installed outdoor antennas to receive the signal of primary NBC affiliate WKY-TV (channel 4, now KFOR-TV), the first television station ever to sign on in Oklahoma, which began operation on June 6, 1949. In an effort to secure a grant to operate a television station in Oklahoma City, Griffin—who first entered the broadcasting industry in October 1938, when he purchased local radio station KOMA (1520 AM, now KOKC) from Hearst Radio for $315,000—filed competing construction permit/license applications to the Federal Communications Commission (FCC) under two separate companies in which he held ownership interests.

On September 5, 1951, the Oklahoma Television Corporation—a consortium led by Griffin (who, along with sister Marjory Griffin Leake and brother-in-law James C. Leake, became the company's majority owners in July 1952, with a collective 92.7% controlling interest) and investors that included former Oklahoma Governor Roy J. Turner, company executive vice president Edgar T. Bell (who would later serve as channel 9's first general manager), and Video Independent Theatres president Henry Griffing (who acted as a trustee on behalf of the regional movie theater operator)—filed an application for a construction permit to build and license to operate a television station on VHF channel 9. On June 27, 1952, KOMA Inc., a licensee corporation of KOMA radio that was largely owned by Griffin and the Leakes, filed a separate application to operate channel 9. The FCC eventually granted the license to the Oklahoma Television Corporation on July 22, 1953, after the company struck an agreement with KOMA Inc. days prior to merge their respective bids, in exchange for KOMA purchasing 50% of the shares in Oklahoma Television that were owned by that group's original principal investors. (Under FCC procedure, the Commission's Broadcast Bureau board decided on license proposals filed by "survivor" applicants at the next scheduled meeting following the withdrawal of a competing bid.) Instead of using the KOMA calls assigned to the radio station, the Griffin group chose instead to request KWTV (for "World's Tallest Video") as the television station's call letters, in reference to the transmission tower that was being built behind its studio facility (which was also under construction at the time) on open land near Northeast 74th Street and North Kelley Avenue; the land plot was purchased by KOMA in 1950, with the intention of developing it for a television broadcast facility. (KOMA would vacate its facilities at the now-demolished Biltmore Hotel in downtown Oklahoma City once the Kelley Avenue building was completed.)

After conducting initial test pattern transmissions beginning on December 8, KWTV officially signed on the air on December 20, 1953. The station's first broadcast was a special 30-minute ceremony inaugurating channel 9's launch at 7:00 p.m. that evening, respectively featuring speeches from Griffin, Bell and Turner, announcements of station policies, and an introduction of station stockholders and employees. KWTV was the third and last commercial television station to sign on in the Oklahoma City market during 1953: two UHF stations—KTVQ (channel 25, allocation now occupied by Fox affiliate KOKH-TV), an ABC affiliate that launched on October 28, and KLPR-TV (channel 19, allocation now occupied by Cornerstone Television affiliate KUOT-CD), a DuMont Television Network affiliate that debuted on November 8—would eventually cease operations within three years of their respective debuts. Originally broadcasting daily from 6:00 a.m. to midnight, channel 9 has been a CBS television affiliate since its debut (WKY-TV aired select CBS programming until November 14); the affiliation owed to KOMA radio's longtime partnership with the CBS Radio Network, which had been affiliated with its then-radio sister since 1929. KWTV also maintained a secondary affiliation with DuMont, from which WKY-TV had also carried selected programs, until the network discontinued operations in August 1956. On October 15, 1956, KWTV began carrying programming from the NTA Film Network; channel 9 served as the programming service's secondary Oklahoma City affiliate, offering a limited schedule of drama and comedy series. (Most of NTA other shows were shown on WKY-TV, while ABC affiliate KGEO-TV only aired its NTA Film Spectacular anthology series.) This relationship lasted until National Telefilm Associates discontinued the service in November 1961, when KWTV became exclusively affiliated with CBS.

Channel 9—which is one of the few television stations in the United States to have had the same callsign, ownership, primary network affiliation and over-the-air channel allocation throughout its history—temporarily transmitted its signal from KOMA's  broadcast tower near the television station's Kelley Avenue studios. (It would be surpassed for the title in December 1956, when Roswell, New Mexico-based KSWS-TV [now KOBR] activated a  guy-wired tower in Caprock, New Mexico.) To commemorate the new tower, an event that KWTV management estimated had 5,000 attendees, an amateur photography competition was held in which the winning pictures of the tower (with photography equipment donated by local camera stores being awarded to the finalists) would be chosen for inclusion in station publicity advertisements. A young Johnny Carson, then the host of the CBS game show Earn Your Vacation, served as master of ceremonies for the tower's dedication. The Oklahoma Educational Television Authority (OETA)—which, per an agreement with the Oklahoma Television Corporation, was granted free use of the land near the KWTV studio and transmitter—became a tenant on the tower in April 1956, when the educational broadcaster's flagship station KETA-TV (channel 13) activated its transmitter. (The tower was decommissioned following the transition of KWTV and KETA to digital-only broadcasts in the spring of 2009, as their digital transmitters were located on a separate tower between 122nd Street and the John Kilpatrick Turnpike; the antenna and the upper half of the tower were physically disassembled by engineers and crane equipment during the summer of 2014, and its remnant sections were imploded that October.) The station relocated its operations into its new Kelley Avenue studio facility on October 17, 1954.

Some of the local programs that channel 9 produced over the years have included the children's program Miss Fran from Storyland, in which host Fran Morris—who hosted the show from 1958 to 1967, during her tenure as KWTV's director of educational programming, before moving to WKY-TV/KTVY to host the similarly formatted Sunday Morning with Miss Fran for an additional 17 years—told children's stories, conducted arts and crafts demonstrations, displayed viewer-submitted artwork on a "storyboard," and occasionally showcased Davey and Goliath animated shorts; The Gaylon Stacy Show, a half-hour morning talk-variety program—whose host had also helmed two other shows during his tenure at KWTV, the Saturday morning children's show Junior Auction and the variety-game show You Name It—that ran from 1960 to 1970, which featured live guests and on-location celebrity interviews; and Foods 'n Focus, a five-minute-long, Oklahoma Natural Gas-produced cooking show hosted by Jane Frye that ran from 1973 to 1977. The Griffin-Leake interests sold KOMA (which, is now owned by Oklahoma City-based Tyler Media) to Radio Oklahoma, Inc.—an investor-owned group led by radio executive Burton Levine—on November 20, 1956, for $342,500, but chose to retain ownership of KWTV.

Over the years, the Griffin family owned other television stations in Oklahoma and Arkansas. On December 15, 1953 (five days before KWTV signed on), the Griffin-Leake partnership launched their first television station, ABC affiliate KATV in Little Rock, Arkansas; the group would later sign on their second ABC-affiliated station, KTVX (now Tulsa-based KTUL) in Muskogee, on September 18, 1954. Post-split from Leake, Griffin Television bought NBC affiliate KPOM-TV (now Fox affiliate KFTA-TV) in Fort Smith from Ozark Broadcasting Co. in September 1985; then in October 1989, it signed on KFAA (now KNWA-TV) in Rogers as a satellite station serving Fayetteville and other areas of northwest Arkansas that could not receive KPOM's signal. (KPOM and KFAA were owned by the Griffins until 2004, when it sold the two stations to the Nexstar Broadcasting Group.) Griffin Communications re-entered the Tulsa market with its October 2000 purchase of fellow CBS affiliate KOTV from the Belo Corporation; Griffin gained a second station in that market when it purchased Muskogee-based WB affiliate KWBT (now CW affiliate KQCW-DT) from Cascade Broadcasting Group in October 2005.

Sole ownership by Griffin
In April 1961, Triarko Ltd.—a subsidiary of RKO General—purchased a controlling stake in Video Independent Theatres from the estate of the late Henry Griffing. On paper, the 12.5% interest in KWTV included in the deal effectively gave RKO its fifth VHF television station, putting it at the maximum then allowed under FCC ownership rules (alongside its wholly owned station properties in New York City, Los Angeles, Boston and Memphis as well as a controlling stake in a Canadian station in Windsor, Ontario, that dually served the Detroit market). This created an issue for a then-ongoing and complex transaction in which RKO was to have acquired WRC-TV and WRC-AM-FM (now WTEM and WKYS) in Washington, D.C., from NBC, trade WNAC-TV (now defunct; former channel allocation now occupied by WHDH), WNAC-AM (now WRKO) and WRKO-FM (now WBZ-FM) in Boston to NBC in exchange for the WRCV television and radio stations (now KYW-TV and KYW (AM)) in Philadelphia, and sell the Washington-based WGMS radio stations (now WWRC and WTOP-FM) to Crowell-Collier Broadcasting. Philco—which protested the 1957 license renewal of WRCV-TV-AM to NBC amid questions over the legality of its purchase of the stations from Westinghouse in exchange for WTAM-AM-FM and WNBK television (now WKYC) in Cleveland the year before—took issue with whether RKO's interest in KWTV violated FCC ownership rules. Addressing this, in August 1962, RKO agreed to sell its stake in channel 9 to minority stockholders Roy Turner and Luther Dulaney, increasing their individual interests in the station to 18.75%.

On November 29, 1963, the Griffin-Leake interests purchased Turner and Dulaney's 25% interests in KWTV for $200,000 and title rights to the equipment used by KWTV, KTUL and KATV. Turner and Dulaney would then sell the equipment, valued at $2.3 million, to First National Bank of Oklahoma City executives C.A. Voss and James Kite for $3 million. Griffin-Leake's Oklahoma stations would then be folded into KATV parent licensee KATV Inc. (subsequently rechristened as Griffin-Leake TV), which would enter into a ten-year, $4.5 million (or $37,500 per month) agreement with Voss and Kite to lease the equipment. Griffin and the Leakes would own approximately all of the common voting stock and collectively own 84% of nonvoting common shares in KATV Inc. post-merger, with 10% of the remaining nonvoting interest held by Edgar Bell (who would remain KWTV's executive vice president and general manager).

In early 1964, KWTV's Kelley Avenue facility was expanded to include a new  soundstage on the building's west end (which would incorporate transistorized broadcasting and recording equipment), and a separate control room and production facilities. On April 17, 1969, Griffin-Leake TV announced its intent to split its assets into two separate companies. Griffin would retain ownership of KWTV under the rechristened entity that became Griffin Television Inc. (renamed Griffin Communications in 2000 and Griffin Media in 2022), while Leake retained ownership of KATV, KTUL, Ponca City-based cable television operator Cable TV Co. of Oklahoma, and a controlling 80% interest in the construction permit for Fajardo, Puerto Rico, television station WSTE (now WORO-DT) through the spin-off entity Leake TV, Inc. In 1982, with the launch of the overnight news program CBS News Nightwatch, KWTV became the first television station in the Oklahoma City market to maintain a 24-hour programming schedule on weekdays (KTVY had begun maintaining a 24-hour schedule on Fridays and Saturdays in 1978); the station would not adopt a 24-hour schedule regularly until the launch of CBS News Up to the Minute in September 1992.

Ownership of KWTV would transfer to the familial heirs of John Griffin—widow Martha Watson Griffin (who also assumed her husband's post as KWTV board chairman), and sons John W. and David Griffin (both of whom would become KWTV executives in 1990, with David eventually taking over as President of Griffin Communications in 2001)—after he died on July 26, 1985, at the age of 62. That year, KWTV began producing Bingomania (a co-production with Dayton, Ohio-based Prijatel Productions), a half-hour bingo game show—developed as a relaunch of the local program $20,000 Jackpot Bingo, which premiered on the station in September 1985—that was briefly available in limited national syndication through licensing deals with individual stations; after a two-year run, the program was cancelled in 1987. On February 3, 1997, the station—which had branded itself as "TV-9" since 1981—modified its general branding to "KWTV 9" full-time and retitled its newscasts from Newsline 9 to simply News 9, which would be extended to a full-time generalized brand in May 2001.

On October 25, 2010, KWTV became the first television station in the Oklahoma City market to carry syndicated programming and advertisements inserted during local commercial breaks (including station and network promos) in high definition. On September 29, 2014, Griffin purchased MyNetworkTV affiliate KSBI (channel 52) from Oklahoma City-based Family Broadcasting Group (owned by a consortium led by former KWTV weekend evening meteorologist Brady Brus, which—under its former name, Christian Media Group—outbid Griffin to purchase KSBI in 2001) for $33.5 million. The transaction was finalized on December 1, 2014, making KWTV and KSBI became the fourth commercial television duopoly in the Oklahoma City market. KSBI subsequently migrated its operations from its studio facility on North Morgan Road in Yukon, into KWTV's Kelley Avenue studios on December 6 of that year. On March 1, 2017, in a move mirroring similar rebrandings made by Fox Television Stations for its MyNetworkTV owned-and-operated and independent stations around this timeframe, Griffin extended KWTV's branding to KSBI under the "News 9 Plus" moniker; Griffin Communications CEO David Griffin said the branding extension was designed to "help create a more inclusive and consistent identity for all of our programming".

The move off of KWTV/KSBI studios
On July 12, 2021, Griffin Communications announced that it had reached an agreement with real estate development consortium 100 Main LLC to purchase the Century Center business and retail complex in downtown Oklahoma City for $26 million. Griffin will construct a media and operations center that would house KWTV/KSBI's broadcast facilities and the company's corporate headquarters inside a vacant  section of the space. Griffin will invest $10 million to renovate the building and plans for the move to be completed by summer 2022. All existing tenants are expected to continue leasing space in the building. After close to 70 years in the West Kelley Street building, the station aired its final newscast the morning of Saturday, November 12, 2022. KWTV will air its newscasts from the Downtown location starting the following evening. The balance of the weekend's newscasts will originate from sister station KOTV in Tulsa.

Subchannel history

KWTV-DT2

KWTV-DT2 (branded as "News 9 Now") is the second digital subchannel of KWTV-DT, which maintains a locally programmed rolling news format. Over the air, it broadcasts in widescreen standard definition on UHF digital channel 39.2 (or virtual channel 9.2 via PSIP). On cable, KWTV-DT2 is available on Cox Communications channel 53 in the Oklahoma City area, Fidelity Communications channel 9 in Lawton, Sparklight channel 33 within its southwestern and south-central Oklahoma systems, and on other cable providers throughout the market.

News 9 Now traces its history to December 3, 1996, when Griffin Television launched News Now 53, a local cable news channel originally developed in partnership with Cox Communications (which only served Oklahoma City proper and Forest Park at the time) and Multimedia Cablevision (which then served the remainder of suburban Oklahoma City, including Midwest City, Bethany, Yukon and Edmond) that primarily aired simulcasts of KWTV's daily newscasts as well as rolling repeats of the station's most recently aired newscast. (During its early years, News Now 53—named for its internally designated channel assignment on participating cable systems—also occasionally aired sports and special event programs that were either exclusive to the channel or had originally aired on channel 9.) The service's creation stems from a contractual stipulation incorporated into retransmission consent agreements that Griffin reached with Cox and Multimedia in August 1993. Initially available exclusively on Cox's Oklahoma City system, Multimedia began carrying News Now 53 on its suburban area systems (which, in January 2000, were sold by the Gannett Company to Cox) on January 6, 1997. The Cox/Griffin partnership launched a feed for the Tulsa area—offering newscasts from newly acquired sister station and fellow CBS affiliate KOTV—in May 2001 on Cox's northeastern Oklahoma systems (which the provider acquired from Tele-Communications Inc. eleven months prior.

KWTV-DT2 first launched in October 2009 as a temporary simulcast of the primary 9.1 feed, while KWTV was in the process of moving the station's digital signal permanently to UHF channel 39, the physical digital allocation it used until the February 2009 termination of analog transmissions; the 9.2 subfeed was deleted after KWTV relocated to UHF 39 full-time on August 30, 2010. KWTV relaunched the subchannel on April 1, 2011, when Griffin Communications—which assumed ownership of Cox's ownership interest in the service—reformatted the Oklahoma City feed of News Now 53 under the standalone brand "News 9 Now". (Concurrently, the service's Tulsa feed was added onto a DT2 subchannel of KOTV under the moniker "News on 6 Now"). News 9 Now maintains the former News Now 53's format of running live and repeat airings of all KWTV newscasts, however it does not rebroadcast News 9 This Morning in its entirety—repeating only the weekday 6:00 a.m. hour and the weekend editions, despite simulcasting the two weekday and one weekend hours that it does not rebroadcast. (All news rebroadcasts on the subchannel are accompanied by a ticker that displays current conditions and weather forecasts for major cities across Oklahoma and right-third-quadrant banner advertisements for KWTV and local businesses.) To fulfill Children's Television Act guidelines, News 9 Now also airs a three-hour block of educational programming aimed at older children and teenagers on Saturday afternoons.

Programming
KWTV-DT currently broadcasts the majority of the CBS network schedule, although it carries the first hour of the CBS Dream Team block on a two-hour delay from the "live" network feed to accommodate CBS Saturday Morning (which it originally preempted from its September 1997 debut under its CBS News Saturday Morning iteration until September 2021) and a two-hour-long edition of News 9 This Morning, then it defers the second hour of the block to Sunday mornings leading into an hour-long edition of the station's morning newscast, with the third hour being aired following its morning newscast on Sunday mornings on its News 9 Now subchannel. (The Saturday edition of CBS Mornings—in its previous Saturday Early Show and CBS This Morning Saturday versions—aired on the News 9 Now subchannel, following a simulcast of the local morning newscast's then three-hour-long Saturday edition, from January 2011 until it began to be cleared on the main channel with the 2021 format change.)

Channel 9 may preempt some CBS programs to provide long-form breaking news or severe weather coverage when necessary, or air prime time specials produced by the station's news department. The preempted programs may either be diverted on a live-to-air basis to KSBI (which also holds the right to air any preempted syndicated programs if KWTV airs extended news coverage in their time periods) or—less commonly since Griffin acquired KSBI—rebroadcast over KWTV in place of regularly scheduled overnight programs, although station personnel also gives viewers the option of watching them on CBS' website and mobile app, Paramount+, or its cable/satellite video-on-demand service the day after their initial airing. (News 9 Now previously handled substitute CBS programming responsibilities from its conversion into an over-the-air-originated service in April 2011 until December 2014, when Griffin transferred those duties to KSBI upon assuming operational responsibilities for that station.)

Partly as a result of the January 2021 launch of its 9:00 a.m. newscast, KWTV's weekday schedule relies very heavily on local newscasts and CBS network programs; with only two hours (one hour in daytime and 90 minutes in the evening and late night) not reserved to local and network shows, it has the least weekday programming time allocated to syndicated content among Oklahoma City's major commercial television stations. Syndicated programs broadcast by KWTV-DT  include Dr. Phil, Castle, Wipeout, Extra and Entertainment Tonight.

Channel 9 formerly served as the Muscular Dystrophy Association (MDA)'s "Love Network" station for the Oklahoma City market, carrying the charity's annual telethon on Labor Day and the preceding Sunday night each September from September 1973 until September 2010. For most of its run on the station, KWTV aired the telethon on a three-hour tape delay following its 10:00 p.m. newscast on the Sunday preceding Labor Day because of CBS entertainment and sports programming commitments. For this reason, KWTV elected not to continue airing the telethon for the September 2011 broadcast, when it was reduced from its original 21½-hour format to a six-hour prime time telecast on the night before Labor Day. (CW affiliate KOCB [channel 34] aired the telethon for its final two years as a syndicated telecast; the event—by then reduced to a two-hour special—moved to ABC, airing locally on KOCO-TV [channel 5], in September 2013 for the final two years of the retitled MDA Show of Strengths overall run.))

KWTV previously served as Oklahoma City's original home of the nighttime syndicated game shows Wheel of Fortune and Jeopardy! from their respective 1983 and 1984 premeires. Wheel moved to KOCO in September 1992, and Jeopardy! was picked up by KFOR beginning January 2000.

Past program preemptions and deferrals
Since its 1953 sign-on, KWTV has periodically preempted or given tape-delayed clearances to some CBS programs to air local, syndicated or special event programs. However, CBS usually did not raise objections to preemptions made by channel 9, since it has typically been one of the network's strongest affiliates. Until 1959, KWTV preempted the CBS Evening News with Douglas Edwards to air syndicated drama series. The station also preempted CBS News Sunday Morning and Face the Nation from September 1984 until August 1995, in favor of carrying an extended block of local and syndicated religious programs on Sunday mornings; from the time they regained clearance until 2005, both programs were shown on a half-hour delay to accommodate an additional half-hour of the station's Sunday morning newscast. After Face the Nation expanded to a one-hour broadcast in April 2014, as certain other CBS affiliates have done since that time, KWTV aired the first half-hour of the Sunday morning talk show live-to-air on Sunday mornings and the second half-hour early Monday mornings on tape delay—the latter scheduling being used previously for the show (in its former half-hour format) from June 1983 until KWTV's September 1984 removal of the program—until February 2016 (during this time, the program aired in its entirety on KWTV-DT2 off its "live" feed through a partial simulcast with the station's main feed during FTNs first half-hour).

In September 1993, the station began carrying The Price Is Right on a one-hour delay to air syndicated programs during the 10:00 a.m. hour, forcing The Young and the Restless to be moved concurrently to 3:00 p.m. After it had considered preempting the talk show because of contractual issues with its late-night syndication lineup shortly before it debuted that month, KWTV became one of a handful of CBS-affiliated stations to receive permission to air the Late Show with David Letterman on a half-hour delay, so as not to displace a secondary run of Jeopardy! it had aired after its 10:00 p.m. newscast since 1989 (it also aired The Pat Sajak Show on such a delay for the same reason during the 1989–90 season, when KWTV resumed clearance of CBS' late night block, which had aired instead on Fox affiliate KAUT [channel 43, now an independent station] the season prior). Channel 9 would eventually give in to airing the Late Show in its network-designated 10:35 timeslot in September 1994; The Price Is Right and The Young and the Restless, however, would continue to air on a delayed basis until both shows returned to their recommended 10:00 a.m. and 11:00 a.m. respective timeslots in September 2000. The station also delayed The Late Late Show—spanning the entirety of the Tom Snyder and Craig Kilborn versions, and the first six years of the Craig Ferguson version—until 12:07 a.m. from the program's September 1995 debut until March 28, 2011, due to its weeknight airing of Seinfeld (which moved to KOKH on the latter date). Channel 9 also aired the CBS Saturday morning children's block (now branded as the CBS Dream Team) in two separate blocks until September 2010, with the majority of the block airing in pattern from 8:00 to 10:30 a.m. and an additional half-hour airing on a one-week delay at 5:30 a.m.

Sports programming
Seven years before Griffin Communications acquired the latter station, KWTV and KOTV in Tulsa partnered to simulcast three games involving the state's two Central Hockey League franchises, the Oklahoma City Blazers and the Tulsa Oilers, during the league's 1993–94 regular season; the respective sports directors of both stations at that time, Bill Teegins and John Walls, conducted play-by-play for the broadcasts, with KWTV sports anchor Ed Murray (who would later become a news anchor in 1999, and remain in that role until his retirement from television news in 2013) doing color commentary. From 2000 to 2011, KWTV served as the broadcast home for Oklahoma State Cowboys and Cowgirls basketball games under an agreement with Oklahoma State University's Cowboys Sports Network syndication service; the station typically broadcast around three regular season games each year during the run of the contract, which usually aired on a Wednesday or Saturday during prime time.

In August 2013, channel 9 obtained the local television rights to broadcast NFL preseason games involving the St. Louis Rams produced by the team's in-house syndication service, the Rams Television Network; for the 2015 season, KWTV diverted broadcasts of the team's Thursday night preseason games to sister station KSBI. (Prior to its acquisition of channel 52, the Thursday games forced KWTV to air first-run episodes of the CBS reality series Big Brother in late night to allow viewers to watch or record the affected episode on a delayed basis.) KWTV/KSBI's contract with the Rams concluded after the 2015 season as a result of the team's move to Los Angeles effective the following year. (Ironically, most Rams regular season games air on Fox affiliate KOKH-TV by way of Fox's contractual rights to the NFL's National Football Conference, while KWTV only carried regular season games featuring the team if CBS was scheduled to carry an interconference games against an opponent in the American Football Conference, or after 2014, an NFC-only matchup to which Fox passed the rights to CBS under NFL cross-flex broadcasting provisions.)

On July 24, 2015, Griffin announced an agreement with the Oklahoma Secondary School Activities Association (OSSAA) that would return high school football coverage to KSBI after a five-year sabbatical; as a byproduct of the deal, KWTV also maintained partial over-the-air rights to the OSSAA Class 5A and 6A football championships, which were split between the station's main channel, its News 9 Now subchannel and KSBI.

News operation
, KWTV-DT broadcasts 41 hours of locally produced newscasts each week (with seven hours each weekday, four hours on Saturdays and two hours on Sundays). The News 9 Weather team also provides local weather updates and, in the event of significant severe weather situations (such as a tornado warning) affecting portions of the market, audio simulcasts of long-form severe weather coverage for the Griffin-owned Radio Oklahoma Network and, through a content agreement with locally based Tyler Media Group, the Oklahoma City radio cluster of KOKC, KOMA (92.5 FM), KMGL (104.1 FM), KJKE (93.3 FM) and KRXO-FM (107.7 FM). KWTV also features select stories filed by Tulsa sister station KOTV-DT during its newscasts, and partners with that station to cover news events within the Tulsa market; both stations co-produce the sports analysis program, Oklahoma Sports Blitz, which airs Sundays at 10:25 p.m. on both stations and has been hosted since its August 2001 debut by KWTV sports director Dean Blevins and KOTV sports director John Holcomb.

KWTV has long had a rivalry with KFOR-TV, vying with that station for first place as the most-watched television newscast in the Oklahoma City market in most news timeslots. KWTV had the highest-rated late evening newscast in the United States during the May 2006 sweeps period, and its 10:00 p.m. newscast was the top-rated newscast in the nation in May 2007, and locally during the February 2012 sweeps.

News department history
Channel 9's news department began operations when the station signed on the air on December 20, 1953, when it debuted a half-hour newscast at 10:00 p.m. (broken up, respectively, into 15-minute-long weather and news segments), anchored by Mark Weaver. Bruce Palmer, former news director at WKY (930 AM) and eventual national president of the Radio-Television News Editors Association, headed channel 9's news department as its director of news operations until his retirement from broadcasting in 1966. Palmer also conducted weekly editorial segments that dealt with pertinent local issues; the station's editorials, which continued for several years after Palmer's departure, would help earn KWTV several journalistic honors in subsequent years, including the Sigma Delta Chi Award and the National Headliners Club Award. To enable mobility in shooting spot news content, in 1955, KWTV staff photographer Bill Horton devised a saddle-based shoulder camera rig with a port to insert wet cell batteries on the saddle's rear and an Auricon Cine-Voice audio control panel (which was hooked to a dictaphone-style earpiece to monitor the audio recording) at front. By 1959, the station had launched a half-hour noon newscast and a 15-minute-long early evening newscast that led into the CBS Evening News with Douglas Edwards. KWTV is purported to be the first television station in the Oklahoma City market to conduct consumer and investigative reporting, the first to utilize beat reporters, and was the first television station in the United States to air a consumer-investigative news program, Call for Action, which was based on a KOMA radio show of the same title.

In 1962, assignment reporter Ed Turner (who later become the inaugural executive vice president of CNN upon the channel's launch in June 1980) received accolades for a series of reports on James Meredith, who in October of that year, became the first African American to enroll into and attend the University of Mississippi and whose entry led to civil unrest and rioting at the campus. From 1966 to 1971, KWTV utilized the Eyewitness News format, as it was becoming popular among broadcast stations around the U.S. (the Eyewitness News format would resurface in Oklahoma City at KOCO-TV, which originally used it from 1974 to 1977 and again from July 1998 until April 2013). In 1968, the station hired Paul R. Lehman as a weekend anchor and assignment reporter, becoming the first African American to work as a television reporter in the Oklahoma City market; given the lingering racial climate in the southern United States after the passage of the Civil Rights Act, Lehman's appointment was not without controversy, as some viewers who were displeased with his appointment called into the station's phone switchboard to complain, some of whom went so far as to lodge death threats against him. Lehman co-created and hosted a community affairs show aimed at black audiences, Soul Talk, for the station in 1969.

Upon KWTV's rebranding of its newscasts as Newsroom 9 on September 13, 1971, as the Prime Time Access Rule (an FCC regulatory act that reduced the prime time schedules of the three major networks, which previously ran for 3½ hours, by 30 minutes) was being instituted, KWTV launched Oklahoma City's first hour-long 6:00 p.m. newscast, adding an additional half-hour to its existing early evening newscast, predating the expansion of KFOR-TV's 6:00 p.m. to an hour-long broadcast by 24 years. In November 1972, urban affairs reporter Andrew Fisher—while covering a staff briefing that followed the commission's monthly meeting—interviewed Oklahoma Securities Commission chairman Charles E. McCune about a security registration requirement for Los Angeles-based commodities broker Goldstein, Samuelson, Inc. McCune made an anti-Semitic comment regarding the company's fitness for operation based on its name and, later, with full knowledge he was being recorded by Fisher, said "I think they are Jewish and I think that they are skunks—the name and what they've done," when asked what prompted the earlier remark. The interview led to his resignation (called upon by then-Governor David Hall) following the broadcast of the remark on the station's newscasts. H. Martin "Marty" Haag, who oversaw the news department at that time, left KWTV in 1973; that year, he brought over three of the station's top-tier reporters, Tracy Rowlett, Doug Fox and Byron Harris, to his new job as news director at WFAA in Dallas-Fort Worth as part of his successful effort to strengthen that station's news operation.

In 1976, Pam Olson became the first woman to anchor a local evening news program in the Oklahoma City market, when she was paired alongside Jerry Adams (who would later anchor at KTVY and KOCO-TV during the 1980s) on the 6:00 p.m. newscast. Olson's tenure at the station (ending with her departure in 1980 to become Atlanta bureau correspondent for CBS News, with Olson being replaced on the 6:00 broadcast by Debi Faubion) saw the airing of a documentary she wrote and produced in cooperation with the National Kidney Foundation, Gift of Life, which chronicled four kidney dialysis patients awaiting transplants; the special led to the passage of a state law that created an organ donor registry and donor ID information on Oklahoma identification cards and drivers' licenses. That year, KWTV became the first television station in the Oklahoma City market to transition from film to videotape to record news footage, with the purchase of camcorder equipment it branded as "Live MiniCam 9". On September 18, 1978, the station split its early evening newscasts into two half-hour programs at 5:00 and 6:00 p.m., bookending the 5:30 p.m. airing of the CBS Evening News, the former of which was the first 5:00 p.m. newscast to debut in the Oklahoma City market; also on that date, KWTV launched Midday, an hour-long 11:30 a.m. newscast that was originally anchored by former KOCO anchor Dean Swanson (who was also lead anchor of the station's new 5:00 p.m. newscast), Laurie Heritage, Tom Mahoney and longtime morning weather anchor Lola Hall; the newscast was the first hour-long midday newscast in the Oklahoma City market, predating the expansion of KFOR's noon newscast by 14 years. (The midday newscast was shifted to 11:00 a.m. on February 4, 1980, to accommodate the hour-long expansion of its CBS soap lead-in The Young and the Restless, and was subsequently reduced to a 30-minute noon newscast on September 15 of that year.)

In 1979, the station began utilizing a helicopter to provide coverage of breaking news events and severe weather, with the introduction of "Hot Shot 9" (renamed "Ranger 9" in 1981). A rotational camera was installed below the nose of the chopper (branded as "EagleVision") in 2000, superseding the need for an in-helicopter cameraman to film breaking news. The helicopter used for "Ranger 9" was sold to KOTV to replace its previous helicopter model in 2006, when KWTV purchased a $1.5-million Bell 407 helicopter, branded as "SkyNews9 HD" (now branded "Bob Mills SkyNews9 HD", through a sponsorship and brand licensing agreement with Oklahoma City-based regional furniture retail chain Bob Mills Furniture), which was the first in the market to be equipped with a high-definition camera that also has optical zoom capability (though helicopter images were not broadcast in HD until the station converted its news broadcasts to the 16:9 aspect ratio in October 2010).

Ratings for KWTV's newscasts—then branded as Big 9 News, before adopting the Newsline 9 moniker in August 1981—dropped to third place in 1980, partly due to a resurgent KOCO news operation, which overtook it for second place among the market's evening newscasts with the team of Jack Bowen, Mary Ruth Carleton, chief meteorologist Fred Norman and sports director Jerry Park. The station enacted a series of staffing changes to shore up its news viewership, resulting in the firings of longtime anchors Bert Rudman and Phil Schuman, and reporter Debra Lane during the early 1980s. Replacing Adams and Faubion on the 6:00 and 10:00 p.m. newscasts were Roger Cooper and Patti Suarez, who, alongside chief meteorologist Gary England and sports director Jim Miller (later replaced by the fall of 1981 by John Snyder, who had previously served as KWTV's sports director in the mid-to-late 1970s), led channel 9 to an intense battle with and, by the mid-1980s, eventually overtake KTVY for the top ratings spot in evening news. Channel 9 also poached several former KOCO personalities (including reporters Gan Matthews and Jennifer Eve, farm reporter Gene Wheatley, and sports anchor Tony Sellars) in 1984, amid a massive staff restructuring at channel 5 under newly appointed vice president of news operations Gary Long. They were later followed by the arrival of another KOCO anchor, Jack Bowen, who replaced Cooper as evening co-anchor in 1987. In 1986, KWTV rolled out a satellite news-gathering unit, "Newstar 9" a transportable video uplink system that the station used to cover news and weather events around and outside of Oklahoma.

Bill Teegins was a fixture for many years as KWTV's sports director (a position that the station briefly considered eliminating around the time of his arrival). Teegins—who joined channel 9 as Snyder's replacement in 1987 after working as sports director at KOTV in Tulsa, and would add duties as radio play-by-play announcer for Oklahoma State Cowboys basketball and football games in 1991—became known for his exuberant analysis style, his sports knowledge, and his catchphrases used during sportscasts and play-by-play calls ("He got it!" and "Oh, brother"). Teegins remained with KWTV until January 26, 2001, when he, two players and six coaching staff members with the Oklahoma State University basketball team, and the airplane's pilot were killed in a charter plane accident, in which a Beechcraft Super King Air 200 en route to Stillwater following a game against the Colorado Buffaloes crashed in a field during heavy snowfall near Strasburg, Colorado. Replacing Teegins as sports director was former KOCO sports director and former University of Oklahoma quarterback Dean Blevins, who had joined KWTV in 1997 as a sports analyst and co-host of the fledgling Sunday night sports analysis program Inside the Game (which evolved into the Oklahoma Sports Blitz in 2001) alongside Teegins.

Three years after his unexpected firing, in July 1990, Roger Cooper returned as anchor of the 6:00 and 10:00 p.m. editions of Newsline 9, after the station failed to renew Bowen's contract. (Bowen would subsequently return to KOCO as an early evening anchor; Cooper would depart KWTV for the second time in June 1993.) Former co-anchor Patti Suarez concurrently left to become 10:00 p.m. co-anchor at Fox owned-and-operated station KTTV in Los Angeles, and was replaced that August by Jenifer Reynolds (who joined KWTV as a State Capitol reporter in 1987). A duPont–Columbia University Award winner for her work at Stillwater public radio station KOSU (91.7 FM) while a student at Oklahoma State University, her 14-year tenure at KWTV (ending with her departure from television journalism in 2001, later to host the Oklahoma Department of Tourism and Recreation-produced Discover Oklahoma from 2003 until 2017, largely overlapping with the travel program's run on KWTV) also saw her conduct investigative reports that had led to reforms of state charity bingo laws, the closure of a chemical supply store that the Drug Enforcement Administration (DEA) failed to shut down despite it selling chemicals commonly used to make illegal drugs and the dissolution of a DEA fund trust by the Oklahoma City Council, issues of corruption that spurred management changes at the Oklahoma Highway Patrol, and the implementation of the Emergency Medical Services Authority to provide EMS services in Oklahoma City. In May 1991, KWTV began providing closed captioning of its newscasts for deaf and hard of hearing viewers. The station became the third and last television station in Oklahoma City to launch a weekend morning newscast in July 1993, with the debut of a two-hour Saturday broadcast from 6:00 to 8:00 a.m.; the program was joined by a Sunday edition in September 1995.

Kelly Ogle joined KWTV as a business/investigative reporter and midday news anchor in 1990; his family has primarily been associated with KFOR-TV since his father, Jack Ogle, served as an anchor (and later, news director) at channel 4 from 1962 to 1977, although had a prior association with channel 9 through occasional commentary pieces that Jack conducted for the station into the 1980s. (Kelly's older brothers, Kevin and Kent, now both serve as anchors at KFOR, while elder niece Abigail Ogle works as an evening anchor/reporter at KOCO; younger niece Katelyn Ogle joined KWTV in February 2019 as News 9 This Morning "Alert Desk" reporter and assignment reporter for the noon and early evening newscasts.) Kelly moved to evenings in June 1993, when he replaced Mitch Jelniker (son-in-law of former KWTV president Duane Harm, and whom concurrently moved to the 6:00 and 10:00 p.m. newscasts) as lead anchor of its 5:00 p.m. newscast; he added duties as primary co-anchor of the 6:00 and 10:00 p.m. newscasts—first paired alongside Reynolds on those broadcasts—in 1995, after Jelniker accepted an anchor/reporter position at KMGH-TV in Denver. In 2005, Kelly began hosting "My Two Cents," a Monday-through-Thursday op-ed segment during the 10:00 p.m. newscast similar in format to Jack Ogle's commentaries, which also features an "open topic" forum featuring comments responding to the editorials. Several of Kelly's special reports, feature and investigative pieces have earned him several journalism awards over his career with the station (including Sigma Delta Chi, Associated Press and Heartland Emmy Awards, as well as a 2009 Edward R. Murrow Award for his coverage of the aftermath of an EF4 tornado that destroyed most of Lone Grove); the Oklahoma chapter of the National Academy of Television Journalists also named him "Best Anchor" in 1999. Ogle's co-anchors have included Deborah Lauren (1993–1995), Robin Marsh (1995–2001), Reynolds (1995–2001), Ann Halloran (2001–2002), Amy McRee (2003–2010), and Amanda Taylor (2006–present: Taylor had joined KWTV in September 2006 as 5:00 p.m. co-anchor and consumer reporter; she added additional duties as the co-anchor of the 6:00 and 10:00 p.m. newscasts when McRee left in September 2010.).

In January 2001, KWTV entered into a content partnership with The Oklahoman, which involved pool coverage between the two properties on major news stories and investigative series, KWTV-compiled local forecasts and a regular Q&A feature from then-chief meteorologist Gary England on the newspaper's weather page, and promotion of news stories and investigative reports in the newspaper and on channel 9's newscasts. That August, this relationship extended to the consolidation of KWTV and The Oklahomans online presence under the "NewsOK" banner, which incorporated in-depth reporting combined with video supplied by the station, and utilized existing web staff from the respective properties. (Ironically the Gaylord family, who ran the newspaper from 1907 until parent company OPUBCO Communications Group sold it to The Anschutz Corporation in 2011, built and signed on competitor KFOR-TV in June 1949, and owned that station until 1976.) The collaboration ended in March 2007, when OPUBCO bought out Griffin's interest in NewsOK.com, which now exclusively operates as the website for The Oklahoman.

On August 26, 2001, KWTV premiered the Oklahoma Sports Blitz (briefly titled OKBlitz.com from 2014 to 2015), a 45-minute-long—later reduced to 35 minutes—statewide sports news program created in partnership with Tulsa sister station KOTV and airs after the respective late evening newscasts on both stations; the program features sports highlights, analysis and commentary and utilizes the resources of the KWTV and KOTV sports departments. In October 2001, KWTV formed the "Local News Network", a news content pooling arrangement between KWTV and several radio stations owned by QuinStar Communications in small and mid-sized Oklahoma communities, which served as charter affiliates of the Griffin-owned statewide news service Radio Local News Network (RLNN; now the Radio Oklahoma Network). Under the arrangement, channel 9 anchors conducted one-minute-long news capsules that would air each half-hour in select morning and afternoon timeslots on the RLNN affiliates, with stories occurring within the affiliates' listening areas included on KWTV's newscasts.

In November 2006, KWTV debuted a high definition-ready news set designed and built by FX Group. On August 2, 2010, the 4:00 p.m. newscast (which debuted on May 8, 1995, as a half-hour newscast, moved to 4:30 p.m. on October 12, 1998, then moved back to 4:00 and expanded to an hour on September 7, 1999) was reformatted from a traditional newscast into a more feature and lifestyle-driven program. On October 24, 2010, KWTV became the second television station in the Oklahoma City market to begin broadcasting its local newscasts in high definition (the graphics, logo, "Oklahoma's Own" slogan and "CBS Enforcer Music Collection" theme that debuted with the change, were also adopted by KOTV that same day upon that station's upgrade to widescreen standard definition newscasts). On January 24, 2011, KWTV expanded its weekday morning newscasts with the addition of a third hour of the program at 4:00 a.m. In September 2013, KWTV expanded its weekend morning newscasts to three hours starting at 5:00 a.m. On August 16, 2014, KWTV expanded its existing 6:00 p.m. newscast on Saturday evenings to one hour, with the addition of a half-hour block at 6:30 p.m. In August 2015, KWTV adjusted its lower-third graphics—which were originally designed to fit the 4:3 safe zone for TV sets in that aspect-ratio—to fit 16:9, which would allow for the AFD #10 broadcast flag to be used to present its newscasts in letterboxed widescreen for viewers watching on cable through 4:3 television sets.

In February 2016, KWTV launched "Drone 9", a quadcopter—the first to be used for newsgathering purposes in the Oklahoma City market—that would be used to provide aerial footage as a supplement to "Bob Mills SkyNews9 HD". Likewise, sister station KOTV subsequently deployed a quadcopter branded as "Drone 6" (it is unclear as to whether it is just a single quadcopter used by both stations). On July 14, 2016, KWTV announced the implementation of "StreetScope", an Augmented Reality System developed by Churchill Navigation that overlays street and building names over live footage from the station's helicopter camera during breaking news and severe weather events; it is the first television station in the United States to use this technology.

Weather coverage
KWTV places a significant emphasis on weather, and has long been considered to be a pioneer in severe weather coverage and television forecasting technology. Most of these advances were attributed to Seiling native Gary England, who was often referred to as "Oklahoma's #1 meteorologist" in station promotions and newscast introductions for most of his tenure with channel 9. England holds the record as the state's longest-serving television meteorologist, working as chief meteorologist at KWTV from October 16, 1972, until his retirement from regular broadcasting on August 28, 2013, shortly before he assumed a newly created post as Griffin Communications' vice president of corporate relations and weather development (England surpassed Jim Williams, who had a 32-year tenure as lead meteorologist at KFOR-TV from 1958 to 1990, for the title in 2005). England—who, in 1986, would become the first Oklahoma City television personality to sign a million-dollar contract package—replaced David Grant, who succeeded original chief meteorologist Harry Volkman (whose tenure also saw channel 9 become the first station in Oklahoma City to acquire a weather radar) in 1960. England's weather coverage earned him numerous awards over his 41-year career with the station (including three Heartland Emmys, National and Regional Edward R. Murrow Awards and a Silver Circle Award, most notably for KWTV's coverage of a tornado outbreak that produced an intense F5 tornado that devastated portions of Moore and Bridge Creek on May 3, 1999).

At the time of England's hiring, KWTV relied on National Weather Service (NWS) data relayed by fax and teletype; the station began using weather satellite imagery provided by CBS for its affiliates in 1973. In 1973, England enlisted ham radio operators to serve as on-scene observationalists during severe weather situations, using a self-diagramed chart of central Oklahoma (divided into  square diagrams) and an alphanumeric coding system he developed for the operators to relay their location. That February, Griffin purchased a World War II-era radar (similar in model to the WSR-57) from Huntsville, Alabama-based Enterprise Electronics Corporation, the first proprietary broadcast weather radar in the U.S (four years later, KWTV became the first television station in Oklahoma to have its own color weather radar). It was first utilized to detect a violent F4 tornado that caused extensive damage in Union City on May 24, 1973 (the original film footage from the accompanying televised warning was featured in station-produced weather promos in later years). England lamented the lack of warning lead time, specifically for tornado warnings (which, in 1974, when NWS protocol required storm spotters to visually confirm a tornado before a warning could be issued, averaged 10 to 15 minutes). In 1978, KWTV became the first television station in the U.S. to broadcast high-resolution weather satellite imagery (with the system being known as "StarCom 9").

With England's consult, John Griffin commissioned Enterprise Electronics to create a commercial Doppler radar for $250,000, spurred by successful testing of a prototype by the National Severe Storms Laboratory during the Union City tornado; the improved radar allowed KWTV to issue tornado warnings before the National Weather Service. The first commercial Doppler radar in the nation for forecasting use was installed at KWTV in 1981 (in late 1984, that radar was replaced by a Fast Fourier Transform system developed by the Massachusetts Institute of Technology, which featured an expanded scanning area with an accuracy of up to ). Two weeks after the radar was installed, on May 22 (shortly before it was shut down briefly due to the expiration of the radar's temporary operational license), it detected a tornado near Arapaho; that tornado—which was recorded by a photographer inside "Ranger 9," which briefly was caught in the parent thunderstorm's inflow winds—became the first ever to have been filmed by a news helicopter. The first broadcaster-issued tornado warning indicated by Doppler occurred using this radar for a tornado that hit Ada on March 15, 1982; the ability to issue warnings ahead of the National Weather Service led to frequent disputes over jurisdiction in the issuance of severe weather alerts between the agency's Norman office and channel 9 into the early 1990s.

From 1982 to 2006, England and the KWTV weather staff presented "Those Terrible Twisters" (titled "Gary's Traveling Weather Show" until 1986), a weather education tour around Oklahoma communities during the spring and summer that taught tornado safety information and promoted the station's severe weather forecasting efforts; the station also produced half-hour specials under that banner each spring, showcasing footage shot by KWTV storm spotters and behind-the-scenes video of its storm coverage. In 1990, England, with the help of a station technician, co-developed First Warning, a software product that displays a weather alert map (which was originally updated via manual input by weather staff) during regular programming, along with a crawl showing detailed alerts issued by the NWS and the National Severe Storms Forecast Center. ("First Alert", an automated iteration of the software, was developed by KOCO that same year.) In 1991, England convinced station management to hire a software development firm to create an application, which would be dubbed "Storm Tracker", an automated computer tracking system that projected the arrival time of precipitation at a particular locale. That year also saw the hiring of Val Castor, a studio camera operator who would eventually become the station's first in-house storm spotter; KWTV gradually expanded its spotter units, employing twelve teams by 1999. In 1992, the station introduced "Storm Action Video", a system (developed by then-evening anchor Roger Cooper) that sent near real-time video over cell phone transmissions using a MacIntosh computer combined with video compression codecs; a similar system that transmitted real-time cell phone video, using Colby Electronics equipment, was developed in 1993.

In 1998, KWTV became one of the first stations in the United States to introduce a model-based computer forecasting system with the introduction of "MAX", which compiled model data to display hour-by-hour forecasts up to 48 hours in advance. On June 13 of that year, during coverage of a supercell thunderstorm that spawned seven tornadoes across Canadian and northern Oklahoma counties, a camera atop the station's transmission tower caught the collapse of a nearby auxiliary tower operated by KFOR-TV and radio station WKY (930 AM) from intense downdraft winds. In 2000, the station introduced "I-News", internet-enabled software for personal computers that provides severe weather and breaking news alerts to users. KWTV debuted "MOAR" (for "Massive Output Arrayed Radar"; though colloquially referred by England as the "Mother of All Radars") on May 8, 2003, to track an F4 tornado that hit Moore; the radar used enhanced street-level mapping to detect the path of tornadoes and GPS to track the location of KWTV's storm spotters. In February 2007, KWTV debuted "Storm Monitor" (later known by its brand name of ESP for "Early Storm Protection"), which utilized VIPIR technology to measure a mesocyclone's strength and its tornado-producing potential.

David Payne, who joined KWTV in February 2013 after a 20-year tenure as a morning meteorologist and storm chaser at KFOR, subsequently took over as chief meteorologist on August 29 of that year. In April 2015, KWTV restructured the extended forecast graphic seen at the end of its weather segments from a seven-day to a nine-day forecast, both in reference to the station's virtual channel number and to take advantage of the 16:9 frame (likewise, rival KOCO-TV subsequently altered its extended forecast to a ten-day outlook, known as the "5+5 Day Forecast", in reference to its virtual channel). On December 2, 2016, KWTV unveiled "NextGen Live", a dual-polarization Doppler weather radar designed by Baron Services, which conducts atmospheric scans at 6 RPM—a faster rate than the radars operated by its three main competitors, KFOR, KOCO (which both have their own on-site radars) and KOKH (which has a radar system that relays NEXRAD imagery from the National Weather Service)—to detect precipitation in real-time; the system operates at one million watts of power, and scans at both X & Y axis (the system is similar to KFOR-TV's dual-pol radar that operates at the same power and predates "NextGen Live" by ten years).

Notable current on-air staff
 Dean Blevins – sports director; weeknights at 5:00 and 6:00 and Sunday-Fridays at 10:00 p.m.; also co-host of Oklahoma Sports Blitz
 Dusty Dvoracek – football analyst
 David Payne (AMS and NWA Seals of Approval) – chief meteorologist; weekdays at 4:00 and weeknights at 5:00, 6:00 and 10:00 p.m.

Notable former on-air staff
 Mike Boettcher – reporter (1978–1980; later correspondent for ABC News)
 Gary England – chief meteorologist (1972–2013; now vice president of corporate relations and weather development at parent company, Griffin Media; makes occasional appearances in TV ads for local HVAC repair company Air Comfort Solutions)
 Shon Gables – weekend morning anchor/reporter (1998–2001; later at WFAA in Dallas–Fort Worth)
 Chris Harrison – weekend sports anchor/reporter (1993–1999; former host of The Bachelor, The Bachelorette and Bachelor in Paradise)
 Tiffany Liou – reporter (2016–2018; now at WFAA)
 Lauren Nelson – 4:00 p.m. anchor (2010–2013; now co-host of Discover Oklahoma)
 Frances Rivera – reporter (1999–2001; now at NBC News)
 Tracy Rowlett – anchor/reporter (1970–1974; later at WFAA and KTVT in Dallas–Fort Worth)
 Ed Turner – reporter/news director (1960–1966; later executive vice president at CNN, now deceased)
 Harry Volkman – chief meteorologist (1954–1960; later at WBBM-TV, WGN-TV and WFLD in Chicago; now deceased)
 Bob "Hoolihan" Wells – announcer (1957–1959; later at WJW in Cleveland)

Technical information
The station's digital signal is multiplexed:

Analog-to-digital conversion and spectrum repack
KWTV-DT began transmitting a digital television signal on UHF channel 39 on December 23, 2003. The station discontinued regular programming on its analog signal, over VHF channel 9, on February 17, 2009, as part of the federally mandated transition from analog to digital television (which Congress had moved the previous month to June 12). The station's digital signal relocated from its pre-transition UHF channel 39 to VHF channel 9. Due to reception issues in parts of central Oklahoma, KWTV was granted permission by the FCC to operate a secondary signal on its former UHF digital channel 39 under special temporary authorization in October 2009, mapped to virtual channel 9.2. On March 9, 2010, the FCC issued a Report & Order, approving the station's request to move its digital signal from channel 9 to channel 39.

On April 20, 2010, KWTV filed a minor change application on its new channel 39 allotment, that was granted on June 10. Short-lived service interruptions began on July 29 to allow viewers to rescan their digital tuners to carry the UHF channel 39 signal. On August 16, 2010, the digital signal on UHF channel 39 added a virtual channel on 9.1, in addition to the 9.2 PSIP channel. KWTV terminated its digital signal on channel 9 and began to operate only on channel 39 on August 30, 2010, at 12:30 p.m.

As a part of the repacking process following the 2016–17 FCC incentive auction, KWTV-DT relocated its physical digital allocation to UHF channel 25 at 12:00 p.m. on November 27, 2018, although it continued to display its virtual channel number as 9 via PSIP. In preparation for the repack, KWTV began operating test signals of their main and subchannel on channel 25 (PSIP-mapped temporarily to virtual channels 9.3 and 9.4) on October 1, 2018; the UHF 25 test feed was converted into a simulcast of KWTV-DT1 and -DT2 (remapped to 9.1 and 9.2, respectively) on October 30, only for the simulcast to be embargoed from November 2 to 19 to comply with FCC regulations limiting the duration of simulcasts on transitional digital television signals.

Translators
To reach viewers throughout the 34 counties comprising the Oklahoma City Designated Market Area, KWTV-DT extends its over-the-air coverage area through a network of nine low-power digital translator stations – all of which transmit using PSIP virtual channel 9 – encompassing much of Western Oklahoma that distribute its programming beyond the  range of its broadcast signal.

Notes

References

External links
News9.com – KWTV-DT official website

CBS network affiliates
Griffin Media
Peabody Award winners
1953 establishments in Oklahoma
Television channels and stations established in 1953
WTV-DT